Hottenstein Mansion, also known as Huddestystettle, is a historic home located in Maxatawny Township, Berks County, Pennsylvania.  It was built in 1783, and is a -story limestone dwelling with red sandstone accents in the Georgian style.  A rear kitchen addition dates to the mid-19th century.  It has a high-pitched gable roof and features a small portico supported by Doric order columns and pilasters.

It was listed on the National Register of Historic Places in 1972.

References

External links
"Moratorium on demolitions in Maxatawny Township a possibility: Officials could develop plan to protect historic properties, expert says," Reading Eagle, Ron Devlin, September 15, 2012

Houses on the National Register of Historic Places in Pennsylvania
Georgian architecture in Pennsylvania
Houses completed in 1783
Houses in Berks County, Pennsylvania
National Register of Historic Places in Berks County, Pennsylvania